The Woodmont Terrace Apartments is a historic apartment complex in Nashville, Tennessee, United States.

Location
The buildings are located at 920 Woodmont Boulevard in Nashville, the county seat of Davidson County, Tennessee.

History
Construction of the eleven apartment buildings began in 1938, and it was completed within a year, in 1939. A year later, in 1940, an office building was built adjacent to the residential buildings. Two decades later, in 1965, five more apartments were added to the office building. By 1983, a gym and a swimming-pool were also added to the office building.

The seven two-storey buildings were designed in the Colonial Revival architectural style.

Architectural significance
The original seven residential buildings have been listed on the National Register of Historic Places since April 21, 2003.

References

Residential buildings on the National Register of Historic Places in Tennessee
Residential buildings completed in 1939
Buildings and structures in Nashville, Tennessee
Colonial Revival architecture in Tennessee
National Register of Historic Places in Nashville, Tennessee